Richard Croft is an American opera singer who is often characterized as a lyric tenor or "Mozart tenor."

Richard Croft debuted in the United States (including at the Metropolitan Opera, the Houston Grand Opera, the Washington Opera and Dallas), by singing the major roles of Mozart and Rossini, before being invited on the leading international stages (Salzburg Festival, Paris Opera, Staatsoper Berlin, Zurich Opera, Glyndebourne Festival, Theater an der Wien among others).

Richard Croft has been Professor of Voice at the University of North Texas College of Music since 2004.

His brother, Dwayne Croft, is an operatic baritone. Both Croft brothers have sung leading roles in historically themed operas by the composer Philip Glass: Richard portrayed Mohandas Gandhi in Satyagraha, and Dwayne portrayed Robert E. Lee in the debut production of Appomattox. He also portrayed the role of Loge in the Metropolitan Opera's 2012 production of Wagner's Das Rheingold directed by Robert Lepage, along with his brother Dwayne in the role of Donner.

References

External links 
 Official website
 Biography on IMG Artists
 Discography on operaclass.com
 

Living people
Year of birth missing (living people)
American operatic tenors
University of North Texas College of Music alumni
University of North Texas College of Music faculty
20th-century American male opera singers
21st-century American male opera singers